Downs is a surname of Old English origin. Notable people with the surname include:

 Alexander Downs (1876–1924), Scottish cricketer
 Anthony Downs (born 1930), American economist 
 Bertis Downs, IV (born 1956), American e–ntertainment lawyer
 Bill Downs (1914–1978), American war correspondent
 Charles E. Downs (1898–1967), American politician
 Cathy Downs (19241976), American actress
 Christopher Downs (born 1974), American boxer
 C. H. "Sammy" Downs (1911–1985), American lawyer and politician
 Dave Downs (born 1952), American baseball player
 David Downs (fl. 1970s), British rugby player
 Deidre Downs (born 1980), American physician and winner of Miss America 2005
 Devante Downs (born 1995), American football player
 Donald Downs (born 1948), American professor
 Dorothea Downs (1917–1968), American baseball player
 Ephraim Downs (1787–1860), American clockmaker
 George W. Downs (physicist) (fl. 1946), American businessman
 George Woodrow Downs (1946–2015), American political scientist
 Georgina Downs, British journalist
 Hollis Downs (born 1946), American politician
 Hugh Downs (1921–2020), American broadcaster
 Jack Downs (born 1995), English rugby player
 James Crawford Downs (born 1940), American lawyer and politician
 James U. Downs (born 1941), American jurist
 Jason Downs (born 1973), American singer
 Jeter Downs (born 1998), American baseball player
 Johnny Downs (1913–1994), American actor
 Joseph Downs (1895–1954), American curator
 Lila Downs (born 1968), Mexican-American singer
 Matt Downs (born 1984), American baseball player
 Nicholas Downs (born 1976), American actor
 Sally Ward Lawrence Hunt Armstrong Downs (1827–1896), American socialite
 Samara Downs, British ballerina
 Scott Downs (born 1976), American baseball player
 Solomon W. Downs (1801–1854), American politician
 Thomas Nelson Downs (1867–1938), American magician
 Wilbur Downs (1913–1991), American naturalist and virologist

See also
Down (surname)

References

English-language surnames